The Burning Season is the first EP by Primordial, released in 1999. The title track would be featured on their follow-up full-length Spirit the Earth Aflame as well.

Track listing

Credits
 A.A. Nemtheanga - Vocals
 Ciáran MacUiliam - Guitars
 Pól MacAmlaigh - Bass
 Simon O'Laoghaire - Drums

References

Primordial (band) albums
1999 EPs